The 2020–21 Georgia State Panthers women's basketball team represented Georgia State University during the 2020–21 NCAA Division I women's basketball season. The basketball team, led by second-year head coach Gene Hill, played all home games at the GSU Sports Arena along with the Georgia State Panthers men's basketball team. They were members of the Sun Belt Conference.

Previous season 
The Panthers finished the 2019–20 season 8–21, 5–13 in Sun Belt play to finish eleventh in the conference. They failed to make it to the 2019-20 Sun Belt Conference women's basketball tournament. Following the season, all conference tournaments as well as all postseason play was cancelled due to the COVID-19 pandemic.

Offseason

Departures

Transfers

Recruiting

Roster

Schedule and results

|-
!colspan=9 style=| Non-conference Regular Season
|-

|-
!colspan=9 style=| Conference Regular Season
|-

|-
!colspan=9 style=| Sun Belt Tournament

See also
 2020–21 Georgia State Panthers men's basketball team

References

Georgia State Panthers women's basketball seasons
Georgia State Panthers
Georgia State Panthers women's basketball
Georgia State Panthers women's basketball